Verkhny Olshanets is a rural locality (a selo) in Shebekinsky District, Yakovlevsky District, Russia. The population was 231 as of 2010. There are 9 streets.

Geography 
Verkhny Olshanets is located 34 km east of Stroitel (the district's administrative centre) by road. Rayevka is the nearest rural locality.

References 

Rural localities in Yakovlevsky District, Belgorod Oblast